Nii Oakley Quaye-Kumah is a Ghanaian politician and a Veterinary Surgeon. He was the member of parliament for the Krowor Constituency from 7 January 2009 to 6 January 2017. He was also the chief executive officer of a number of veterinary hospitals.

Early life and education
Quaye-Kumah was born on 26 September 1959. He hails from Nungua, in the Greater Accra Region of Ghana. He obtained his Master of Veterinary Science from a university in Ukraine in 1989.

Career
Quaye-Kumah is a Veterinary Surgeon. Prior to entering politics, he was the chief executive officer of Beach Animal Hospital in Nungua and Westland Animal Hospital in West Legon, Accra.

Politics
Quaye-Kumah entered parliament on 7 January 2009 on the ticket of the National Democratic Congress (NDC) representing the Krowor Constituency. He was re-elected to represent the constituency for a second consecutive term during the 2012 Ghanaian general election but was unable to contest for the seat for a third consecutive time due to poor health. He was replaced by Agnes Naa Momo Lartey who contested the seat for the NDC during the 2016 Ghanaian general election but lost to Elizabeth Afoley Quaye of the New Patriotic Party.

Personal life
Quaye-Kumah is married with six children. He identifies as a Christian and a member of the International Central Gospel Church (ICGC).

References

Ghanaian MPs 2009–2013
Ghanaian MPs 2013–2017
1959 births
Living people
National Democratic Congress (Ghana) politicians